e-Amusement, stylized as e-amusement, is an online service operated by Konami, used primarily for online functionality on its arcade video games. The system is used primarily to save progress and unlockable content between games, participate in internet high score lists, access other exclusive features depending on the game, and access the Paseli digital currency service.

The system uses online user accounts tied to a contactless smart card system called the "e-Amusement Pass". Users log into an e-Amusement enabled game by holding their pass up to the card reader and using a PIN.

The system is similar to parts of the functionality of the rival Taito NESYS and SEGA ALL.Net systems.

Cards 

Magnetic cards

Prior to 2006, e-Amusement used magnetic stripe cards called Entry Passes that were sold separately for each game using the platform, either from an arcade desk or through a vending machine. Each card held data for one player, and typically came in 5 designs specific to the game (usually featuring character artwork). "Special" cards were also distributed from time to time, often alongside the console versions of certain games; these cards could sometimes be used to unlock special content in their respective game.

e-Amusement Pass 

In 2006, Konami began to phase out the original magnetic card system in favor of the e-Amusement Pass; a contactless smartcard that works across all games that were upgraded to use the new system. The new cards also use a 4-digit PIN for security. In the event the pass is lost, its existing data can be transferred over to a new pass through Konami's website.

The pass can also be linked to a mobile phone "Konami NetDX" account, allowing players to access their scores and other data on their mobile phone. On some games, customization of the game can also be done through the NetDX system. However, only smartphones sold to Japan with FeliCa RFID support can use this function.

Beatmania IIDX
Beatmania IIDX is one of the prominent games using the e-Amusement service. It allows players to register scores and records, use a live Internet ranking system, and unlock new songs.

When registering an e-Amusement Pass for the first time with a Beatmania IIDX machine, the player is issued a "IIDX ID". The IIDX ID can be used to select other players as rivals and track your progress compared to them.

Users subscribed to the Konami NetDX service can also customize the game UI, by changing the graphics, system music, displayed categories and combo counter.

Beatmania IIDX 9th Style was the first version to use e-Amusement, and is the only version which allows use of the card readers without a live network connection. All subsequent versions require a direct connection to Konami's e-Amusement service for the card readers to function.

Beatmania IIDX 13: DistorteD was the first version to use the new "e-Amusement Pass", previous versions used the magnetic card system.

Dance Dance Revolution
Dance Dance Revolution SuperNova was the first ever DDR title to support the e-Amusement Pass.

e-Amusement is used for a Rival system and for automatic uploading of scores to Internet Ranking.  The boss songs Fascination MAXX, Fascination ~eternal love mix~, Healing-D-Vision and CHAOS were unlocked to machines with access to e-Amusement, but e-Amusement functionality was not available in America at the time. However, Fascination ~eternal love mix~ was unlocked on SuperNova in the US with a patch CD which also fixed sync issues. The song Beautiful Life by ARIA and the Nonstop course Back Dancers were also e-Amusement exclusives, only appearing from September to October to promote the release of the film Back Dancers. e-Amusement can also display player's high scores (similar to home versions) as well as display the overall machine, regional, or global high scores which would be presented during the loading screens.

Most of e-Amusement functionality from SuperNova is retained in Dance Dance Revolution SuperNova 2. The game extends the functionality by adding My Groove Radar, a personal Groove Radar that is formed based on player's scores which can be used to track the player's advantages and weakness and a new level-up unlocking system called "Enjoy Level" . The workout feature, which was previously exclusive to home versions, is integrated within arcade series using e-Amusement. e-Amusement is required to participate in certain events, such as "Zukin Wars". Players are also offered with "Original Courses", custom Nonstop (or Challenge) courses that can be created through e-Amusement mobile site. A North American e-Amusement network tested for SuperNova 2, with the sole connected unit located at the Brunswick Bowling and Billiards location in Naperville, Illinois.

In Dance Dance Revolution X, along with the reintroduced Edit Data feature (which was absent in SuperNova series), players can transmit the edits to other machines with active e-Amusement that are frequently played by players. Players can also pay fees to e-Amusement mobile site to enable certain options, such as displaying player's high scores during gameplay and change the position of combo counter. Outside of Asia, no DDR X machines were connected to the e-Amusement network. The new cabinet design for X also introduced a revised card reader that supports data from e-Amusement.

From Dance Dance Revolution SuperNova 2 to Dance Dance Revolution X2, unlock codes were required to unlock hidden content in North American and European builds of DDR.

In DDR X3 vs 2ndMix, the Target Score function is introduced which can display the machine's (and regional) high scores during song selection screen.

The North American release of Dance Dance Revolution A is the first game to support e-Amusement outside of Asia.

Since June 2017, an e-Amusement pass is now required to access Challenge-only charts: the 17 available Challenge remixes from DDRMAX2 Dance Dance Revolution 7thMix, the six Groove Radar Specials from Dance Dance Revolution SuperNova 2, and the 16 X-Specials from Dance Dance Revolution X. In previous releases, and prior to this date for DDR A, the e-Amusement pass was optional.

Gitadora (GuitarFreaks and DrumMania)
GuitarFreaks 8th Mix DrumMania 7th Mix were the first GF/DM games to support e-Amusement. GuitarFreaks and DrumMania V3 was the first version to use the new "e-Amusement Pass". The two games support rivals, unlocks, and also allow players to battle against other players over the e-Amusement network. e-Amusement support was also provided outside Japan during a location test of an English build of GuitarFreaks and DrumMania V4 at the same Naperville bowling alley e-Amusement made its American debut at with DDR SuperNova 2.

Otomedius
The use of e-Amusement will allow Internet Ranking and players will be accumulate special and  powerful items as the player increases experience.

Pop'n Music
Pop'n Music uses e-Amusement extensively throughout the recent releases. Since the release of Pop'n Music 9, unlocks have been exclusively remained available to arcades which subscribe to the e-Amusement service. It allows players to save scores, unlock new modifiers, songs, and characters, all varying from one card to another.

Pop'n Music 14: Fever was the first version to use the new "e-Amusement Pass", previous versions used the magnetic card system.

Silent Hill: The Arcade
The use of e-Amusement will allow Internet Ranking and players will be able to start at stages where they previously cleared, instead of playing the game from scratch.

World Soccer Winning Eleven 2008 Arcade
The use of e-Amusement is much similar to the usage of the magnetic cards in Virtua Striker series, allowing players to configure strategies and formations on the move.

See also 
 Taito NESYS
 SEGA ALL.Net

Reference

External links 
  
 Full information on registering an e-Amusement card on Beatmania IIDX can be found.

Konami games
Online video game services